Horstia is a genus of mites in the family Acaridae.

Species
 Horstia amplisucta Fain & Camerik, 1978
 Horstia brasiliensis Fain & Camerik, 1978
 Horstia longa Fain & Chmielewski, 1987
 Horstia major Bischoff-de-Alzuet & Abrahamovich, 1987
 Horstia minor Bischoff-de-Alzuet & Abrahamovich, 1987
 Horstia malaysiensis (Fain, Lukoschus & Nadchatram, 1982)
 Horstia monstruosus (Vitzthum, 1919)
 Horstia ornatus (Oudemans, 1900)
 Horstia pulcherrima (Vitzthum, 1919)
 Horstia rwandae Fain, 1984
 Horstia virginica Baker, 1962

References

Acaridae